Chen Ti (born 3 October 1983) is a Taiwanese professional tennis player. He is part of the Chinese Taipei Davis Cup team. He competes mainly on the ATP Challenger Tour and ITF Futures, both in singles and doubles.

In singles, all of Chen's appearances in a final of a tournament have come at the ITF Tour level, where he has a record of 23 wins and 23 losses. The time from when he won his first title to when he won his most recent title spans 15 years, from September 2003 to July 2018.

In 2005, Chen successfully qualified for his first main draw at the ATP Tour level, at the 2005 Thailand Open defeating Tatsushi Fakuda and Nathan Healey in qualifying before being eliminated in the first round by Paradorn Srichaphan of Thailand, 3–6, 4–6. He has since made 2 other singles main draw appearances; the 2006 Tokyo tournament defeating Takahiro Ittogi and Lars Burgsmuller in qualifying before losing to Japan's Satoshi Iwabuchi in the first round 2–6, 1–6, and the 2007 Mumbai tournament where he defeated Tushar Liberhan and Leos Friedl in qualifying before losing to Australia's Lleyton Hewitt in the first round 3–6, 3–6. He has yet to win a singles main draw match other than in Davis Cup play.

In June 2012, Chen reached the finals of Toyota Bangalore Open ITF tournament, losing to Vishnu Vardhan, 6–2, 4–6, 6–1.

Im doubles, Chen has won 6 ATP Challenger Tour titles and 25 on the ITF Futures Tour. In total, he has a doubles finals record of 31 wins and 29 losses. Other than Davis Cup matches, Chen has played made 2 main doubles draw appearances At the ATP Tour level, at the 2008 Cincinnati Masters partnering with Phillip King where they lost to John Isner and Mardy Fish 4–6, 6–7(2–7), and secondly at the 2015 Shenzen Open partnering Austin Krajicek where they lost to Chris Guccione and André Sá 1–6, 5–7.

In Davis Cup matches playing for Chinese Taipei, Chen has a singles record of 15–17 , and a doubles record of 3–3.

Grand Slams

Chen has competed in the qualifying rounds of a Grand Slam tournament on 18 occasions, none of which saw him advance through to the main draw. His best result was reaching the 3rd and final round of qualifying at the 2008 Australian Open.

Performance timeline

Singles

ATP Challenger and ITF Futures finals

Singles: 46 (23–23)

Doubles: 60 (31–29)

References

External links
 
 

1983 births
Living people
Sportspeople from Keelung
Tennis players at the 2002 Asian Games
Tennis players at the 2006 Asian Games
Tennis players at the 2010 Asian Games
Tennis players at the 2014 Asian Games
Tennis players at the 2018 Asian Games
Asian Games medalists in tennis
Taiwanese male tennis players
Asian Games gold medalists for Chinese Taipei
Asian Games bronze medalists for Chinese Taipei
Medalists at the 2006 Asian Games
Medalists at the 2010 Asian Games
Universiade medalists in tennis
Universiade gold medalists for Chinese Taipei
Universiade bronze medalists for Chinese Taipei
Medalists at the 2005 Summer Universiade
Medalists at the 2007 Summer Universiade